Felix Heide is a German computer scientist working primarily in the fields of computational imaging, computer vision, computer graphics, and deep learning. He is the head of the Princeton University Computational Imaging Lab and the Chief Technology Officer at Algolux.

Education

Heide received his Msc (Computer Science) from the University of Siegen. In 2016, he received his PhD from the University of British Columbia under the advisement of Professor Wolfgang Heidrich. His doctoral dissertation won the Alain Fournier PhD Dissertation Award (best Canadian PhD dissertation in computer graphics) and the ACM SIGGRAPH outstanding doctoral dissertation award (best PhD dissertation in computer graphics and interactive techniques). He then attended Stanford University as a postdoctoral scholar.

Career

In 2015, Felix Heide co-founded Algolux, a Montreal-based artificial intelligence company developing perception technology. He is now the company Chief Technology Officer.

Research

Heide has co-authored close to 50 publications and has received over 2,600 citations. In 2020, six of his papers were accepted at CVPR - including three orals. One of them, “Seeing Around Street Corners: Non-Line-of-Sight Detection and Tracking In-the-Wild Using Doppler Radar” was picked up by numerous publications.

Additionally, he has filed for 16 patents, and 7 of them have been granted as of yet. The last one, “Method and apparatus for joint image processing and perception” was granted in July 2020.

References

Year of birth missing (living people)
Living people
Princeton University faculty
German computer scientists
Prix Alain-Fournier winners